The Xunhua Incident (Chinese: 循化事件) was an uprising of Tibetan and Salar people against the rule of Chinese Communist Party (CCP) in Qinghai, China in April, 1958 and part of the Kuomintang Islamic insurgency. The incident took place in Xunhua Salar Autonomous County of Qinghai Province, the hometown of 10th Panchen Lama, amid the Great Leap Forward. Since March 1958, local officials imposed strict rules for socialist transformations and, in order to prevent uprising, religious leaders including Jnana Pal Rinpoche (加乃化仁波切), a well-respected monk, were forcibly sent for re-education. Over 4,000 people with different ethnic backgrounds subsequently revolted and killed a team leader from the CCP task force. The incident ended in suppression and a massacre by the People's Liberation Army, which killed 435 people within four hours on April 25, most of whom were unarmed civilians.

Historical background 
Under the leadership of Mao Zedong, the Chinese Communist Party (CCP) launched the Anti-rightist Campaign in 1957 and the Great Leap Forward in 1958. Local leaders in Qinghai Province thus intended to achieve the goals of  "socialist revolution" as well as "democratic revolution" in a fast pace.In March 1958, Zhu Xiafu (朱侠夫), the vice secretary of CCP committee in Qinghai, called on fast socialist transformations of nomads and set quota for different areas, forcibly establishing the socialist cooperatives for animal husbandry. At the same time, in order to "prevent uprising", leaders in Qinghai followed the directive of the Central Committee of CCP and began to "use meetings and study sessions to rein in the minority religious leaders". Jnana Pal Rinpoche (加乃化仁波切), a prestigious monk from Bimdo Monastery (温都寺) who was a vice administrator of Xunhua County and had taught Dalai Lama and Panchen Lama, was among the religious leaders sent for re-education.

The uprising 

On April 17, 1958, a group of civilians from Gangca Town resisted the socialist cooperatives and demanded the release of Jnana Pal Rinpoche. They detained the CCP secretary of Gangca Town, cutting down utility poles, and on the next day their protests turned violent, resulting in the death of a team leader from the CCP task force. 

The resistance was joined by local Salar people, and on April 24, over 4,000 people led by the Salar besieged Xunhua County. Some of the stores were robbed and several local officials were beaten. However, the armed resistance fled the area during the night.

Suppression and massacre 
On the morning of April 25, People's Liberation Army (PLA) sent two regiments to suppress the uprising. Upon arrival, the PLA troops started to open fire towards the civilians who demanded the release of Jnana Pal Rinpoche. Within four hours, the troops realized the civilians were mostly unarmed, but had already killed 435 people, with a total casualties of 719. On the afternoon of April 25, a total of 2,499 were arrested, including 1,581 Salars, 537 Tibetans, 343 Hui people and 38 Han Chinese. Official sources state that the death toll within PLA troops was 17, in addition to an estimated loss of properties worth 0.9 million RMB at the time.

Jnana Pal Rinpoche committed suicide in the "study session" after hearing the news, and he was "identified" by officials as the organizer of the uprising. 

Mao Zedong later expressed support for the crackdown in Qinghai, stating that "the uprising of counter-revolutionaries in Qinghai was wonderful, as it was an opportunity for the liberation of working people, and the decision of the CCP committee in Qinghai was absolutely correct".

See also 
 Anti-rightist Campaign
 Great Leap Forward
 1959 Tibetan uprising
 List of massacres in China
 History of the People's Republic of China
 Shadian incident

References

Further reading 

 Shiyuan Hao. How the Communist Party of China Manages the Issue of Nationality—An Evolving Topic. 

Protests in China
Rebellions in China
Massacres in China
Persecution of Muslims
Islam in China
Violence against Muslims
Massacres committed by the People's Republic of China
Salar people
Haidong